Roberto González may refer to:

Artists and entertainers
Roberto González Goyri (1924–2007), Guatemalan painter
Roberto González Echevarría (born 1943), Cuban-born literature critic
Roberto González-Monjas (born 1988), Spanish classical violinist and conductor

Sportspeople
Roberto González Valdez (born 1976), Mexican racing driver
Roberto González (Argentine footballer) (born 1976), Argentine football midfielder
Roberto González (Chilean footballer) (born 1976), Chilean football goalkeeper
Roberto González (cyclist) (born 1994), Panamanian cyclist
Roberto González Bayón (born 2001), Spanish football winger

Other
Roberto González Nieves (born 1950), Puerto Rican clergyman
Roberto González Barrera (1930–2012), Mexican businessman